Robert Etheridge (23 May 1847 – 4 January 1920) was a British palaeontologist who made important contributions  to the Australian Museum.

Biography

Etheridge was born in Cheltenham, Gloucestershire, England, the only son of the palaeontologist, Robert Etheridge and his wife Martha, née Smith. He was educated at the Royal School of Mines, London, under Thomas Huxley, and was trained as a palaeontologist by his father.

In 1866 Etheridge came to Australia, working under Alfred Richard Cecil Selwyn on the Victorian geological survey until it was terminated in 1869, and returned to England in 1871. Two years later he was appointed palaeontologist to the geological survey of Scotland, and in 1874 obtained a position in the geology department in the Natural History Museum at South Kensington. While there in co-operation with P. H. Carpenter he compiled a valuable Catalogue of the Blastoidea. In 1878–1880 with H. Alleyne Nicholson, Etheridge published a Monograph of the Silurian Fossils of the Girvan District in Ayrshire.

Etheridge returned to Australia in 1887 and was given a dual position as palaeontologist to the geological survey of New South Wales and the Australian Museum at Sydney. While in England he corresponded with his friend Dr Robert Logan Jack who had sent him many fossils from Queensland. From 1881 they worked together, and in 1892 there appeared The Geology and Palaeontology of Queensland and New Guinea, by Robert L. Jack and Robert Etheridge, Junior, an elaborate work with many plates and maps. Etheridge founded The Records of the Geological Survey, and published many papers on the fossils of the older strata.

On 1 January 1895 Etheridge was appointed curator of the Australian Museum, and in his hands the collection was much enriched and better displayed. He initiated the Records of the Australian Museum. As he grew older he enlarged his interests to include ethnology. He wrote much on the manners and customs of the Aboriginal Australians and gathered together a remarkable collection of native work for his museum. He also extended the usefulness of the museum by having popular science lectures and demonstrations for visitors. He died suddenly of pneumonia on 4 January 1920. His wife predeceased him and he was survived by two sons.

Robert Etheridge Jr. is noted for a transition in the study of Australia's vertebrate palaeontology. Prior to the works of Etheridge and fellow scientist Gerard Krefft fossil material was sent to experts overseas, but both these workers were confident they were capable of performing these analyses. 

Etheridge wrote a large number of scientific papers, around 350 were published. A list of his papers will be found in the Records of the Australian Museum, vol. XV, pp. 5 to 27. He was awarded the Wollaston Fund by the Geological Society of London in 1877, shared the 1895 Clarke Medal with Robert Logan Jack (awarded by the Royal Society of New South Wales). Etheridge was also awarded the von Mueller medal by the Australasian Association for the Advancement of Science in 1911. Numerous species of animals, both fossil and recent, were named in his honour, and his name was also given to a goldfield in Queensland, a peak in the Kosciusko plateau, and a glacier in Antarctica.

References

Sources

G. P. Walsh, 'Etheridge, Robert (1846-1920)', Australian Dictionary of Biography, Vol. 8, MUP, 1981, pp 442-443. Retrieved on 12 October 2008

1847 births
1920 deaths
British palaeontologists
English geologists
People from Cheltenham